Neesiella may refer to:
 Neesiella (plant), a genus of liverworts in the family Aytoniaceae
 Neesiella, a genus of plants in the family Acanthaceae, synonym of Andrographis
 Neesiella, a genus of fungi in the family Xylariaceae, synonym of Anthostomella